Miche (foaled in 1945) was an Argentinian Thoroughbred racehorse who was imported to the United States in 1948 where he successfully competed at the top levels of racing. He was raced from a base in California by Muriel Vanderbilt Adams, the daughter of William and Virginia Vanderbilt, both of whom were heavily involved in the sport.

Trained by Eddie Hayward for the majority of his career, in 1949 Miche equaled the Hollywood Park track record for 7 furlongs on dirt with a time of 1:21 4/5. In 1952 Eddie Hayward returned to train on the East Coast and Don Cameron took over Miche's race conditioning. Cameron had trained Count Fleet to his U.S. Triple Crown win in 1943. Under his handling, Miche set a new track record at Tanforan Racetrack of 2:02 1/5 for 1 1/4 miles on dirt and earned the most important win of his career when he was awarded first place in the Santa Anita Handicap following the disqualification of Intent for interference.

On October 3, 1952, the New York Times reported that owner Muriel Adams announced Miche's retirement as a result a leg injury sustained while competing in the 1952 Sysonby Handicap at Belmont Park in New York. 

Only very modestly successful as a sire, Miche's best runner was probably Hymient who won several stakes races.

References

External links
 Miche's pedigree and partial racing stats

1945 racehorse births
Thoroughbred family 8-a
Racehorses bred in Argentina
Racehorses trained in the United States
Vanderbilt family